Curtis Alan Jones (born April 26, 1968), better known by his stage name Green Velvet, is an American singer, record producer and DJ. He is also known as Cajmere, Geo Vogt, Half Pint, Curan Stone, and Gino Vittori.

Early life
Curtis Alan Jones was born  on April 26, 1968 in Chicago, Illinois. He grew up listening to blues, jazz, funk, and rock. In the mid 1980s, he was introduced to house music via the radio. He started making music with a "sixty-buck keyboard, a cheap four-track and a cheap drum machine".

Jones graduated from the University of Illinois at Urbana–Champaign with a degree in chemical engineering. After attending the University of California, Berkeley, he moved back to Chicago in 1991.

Career
In 1991, Jones started releasing his music under the Cajmere moniker. In 1992, he founded a record label, Cajual Records. In that year, he released a collaborative single with Dajae, titled "Brighter Days" that peaked at number 2 on the Billboard Hot Dance Music/Club Play chart. In the same year, he released the single "Coffee Pot (It's Time for the Percolator)" also known as "Percolator". Rolling Stone included it on its "20 Best Chicago House Records" list in 2014 while Mixmag included it on its "20 Best US Rave Anthems of the '90s" list in 2019. In 1993, he founded another label, Relief Records.

In 1995, he released a single, "Flash", under the Green Velvet moniker. It reached number 1 on the Billboard Dance Club Songs chart. Billboard included it on the "10 Essential '90s Rave Jams" list in 2019. Mixmag included it on the "20 Best US Rave Anthems of the '90s" list in 2019.

Green Velvet's debut studio album, Constant Chaos, was released in 1999. In 2000, he released a compilation album, Green Velvet. He released Whatever in 2001, Walk in Love in 2005, and Unshakable in 2013.

In 2014, he teamed up with Claude VonStroke to form the side project Get Real. The duo's debut single, "Mind Yo Bizness" / "Snuffaluffagus", was released in 2016. The duo's second single, "Jolean", was released in 2019.

In 2015, he released a collaborative album with Carl Craig, titled Unity.

DJ Mag has described Green Velvet as "a stalwart figure in both house and techno".

Personal life
In the mid 2000s, Green Velvet revealed on Myspace that he had become a born-again Christian, after a serious overdose of a mixture of magic mushrooms, marijuana, and (allegedly) GHB.

Discography

Studio albums
 Constant Chaos (1999) 
 Whatever (2001) 
 Walk in Love (2005) 
 Unshakable (2013) 
 Unity (2015)

Compilation albums
 The Nineties (1993 A.D. Through 1999 A.D.) (1999) 
 Green Velvet (2000) 
 Lost & Found (2009) 
 It's Time (2010) 
 Too Underground for the Main Stage (2013)

DJ mixes
 The Future Sound of Chicago: Cajual Relief (1995) 
 Wheels of Steel Vol. 1 (1997) 
 Techno Funk (2000) 
 Sessions (2006)

Extended plays
 Underground Goodies Vol. I (1991) 
 Underground Goodies Vol. II (1992) 
 Underground Goodies Vol. III (1992) 
 Underground Goodies Vol. IV (1992) 
 Dreaming (1992) 
 Underground Goodies (1993) 
 Let Me Be (1993) 
 Velvet Tracks (1993) 
 Underground Goodies Vol V (1994) 
 Underground Goodies Vol. VI (1994) 
 Destination Unknown (1997) 
 Chicago (2010) 
 New Gotham (2010) 
 The Chicago Jazz (2011) 
 Elevated Tracks (2011) 
 Go Dancing (2011) 
 Chicago Style (2011) 
 Playground (2011) 
 White Label (2012) 
 Black Label (2012) 
 Taste of Chi-Town (2012) 
 Jungle Love (2014) 
 It's All About Me (2014)

Singles
 "Keep Movin'" (1991) 
 "Brighter Days" (1992) 
 "Chit Chat" (1992) 
 "Percolator" (1992) 
 "Feelin' Kinda High" (1994) 
 "Flash" (1995) 
 "Get Up Off Me" (1995) 
 "H*rny" (1995) 
 "Only 4 U" (1996) 
 "The Stalker" (1996) 
 "Answering Machine" (1997) 
 "Lookin' for a Man" (1997) 
 "Feelin'" (1998) 
 "Nasty" (2001) 
 "La La Land" (2001) 
 "Genedefekt" (2002) 
 "Coitus" (2002) 
 "Sometimes I Do" (2003) 
 "Midnight" (2004) 
 "I Need U" (2004) 
 "Nude" (2004) 
 "Come" (2004) 
 "Powered" (2004) 
 "House-Werk" (2004) 
 "Say U Will" (2005) 
 "The Bathroom" (2005) 
 "Temptation" (2005) 
 "No S*x" (2005) 
 "Cuz of You" (2005) 
 "Shake & Pop" (2006) 
 "Bigger than Prince" (2013) 
 "Suga" (2015) 
 "Mind Yo Bizness" / "Snuffaluffagus" (2016) 
 "Keep Pushin' (Harder)" (2017) 
 "Jolean" (2019) 
 "Fuzion" (2019) 
"Unapologetic Raver" (2020) 
"Critical" (2021) 
"My Cheri" (2021)

References

External links

 Official website
 

1968 births
Living people
Singers from Chicago
DJs from Chicago
Record producers from Illinois
Club DJs
Electronic dance music DJs
African-American DJs
American dance musicians
American electronic musicians
American house musicians
American techno musicians
Grainger College of Engineering alumni
21st-century African-American male singers
20th-century African-American male singers